Borai (also Romanized as Borā’ī and Berā’ī; also known as Berā and Deh-e Berey) is a village in Pataveh Rural District, Pataveh District, Dana County, Kohgiluyeh and Boyer-Ahmad Province, Iran. At the 2006 census, its population was 445, in 84 families.

References 

Populated places in Dana County